Piramide is a station on Line B of the Rome Metro. It was opened on 10 February 1955 and is sited on Piazzale Ostiense (across which is the Pyramid of Cestius that gives the station its name) just outside Porta San Paolo, in the Ostiense quarter. Its atrium houses mosaics that have won the Artemetro Roma by Enrico Castellani (Italy) and Beverly Pepper (United States). The station has escalators.

Connections 
Alongside the Metro station is the Porta San Paolo station on the Ferrovia Roma-Lido. The Stazione Ostiense is connected to the metro station via an underpass - from here run the FR1, FR3 and FR5 mainline services.

Surroundings 
Acea
Stazione di Roma Ostiense
via Marmorata post office

Direction of traffic 
Via Marmorata (towards Ponte Sublicio and Trastevere)
Viale Aventino (towards il Circo Massimo)
Via Marco Polo (towards via Cristoforo Colombo-EUR and via Cilicia-Appio Latino)
Via Ostiense (towards the Basilica di San Paolo fuori le mura)

Rioni and quarters 
Rione Testaccio
Rioni Ripa and Aventino
Rione San Saba

Monuments and churches 
Pyramid of Cestius
Porta San Paolo
Protestant Cemetery
Monte dei cocci
Campo Testaccio
Centrale Montemartini
Museo ferroviario di Porta San Paolo
Santa Maria Liberatrice
Chiesa di Santa Sabina
Chiesa di San Saba

Gallery

External links 

Station on the site of ATAC.

Rome Metro Line B stations
Railway stations opened in 1955
1955 establishments in Italy
Rome Q. X Ostiense
Railway stations in Italy opened in the 20th century